Rhabdophis flaviceps, the orangeneck keelback, orange-lipped keelback, or yellow-headed keelback, is a species of snake in the family Colubridae. It is found in Indonesia, Thailand and Malaysia.

References 

Reptiles described in 1854
Taxa named by André Marie Constant Duméril
Taxa named by Gabriel Bibron
Taxa named by Auguste Duméril
Reptiles of Indonesia
Reptiles of Malaysia
Reptiles of Thailand
flaviceps
Reptiles of Borneo